Shivehi (also Romanized as Shīveh'ī) is a village in Senderk Rural District, Senderk District, Minab County, Hormozgan Province, Iran. At the 2006 census, its population was 214, in 38 families.

References 

Populated places in Minab County